Asociația Fotbal Club Chindia Târgoviște, commonly known as Chindia Târgoviște or simply Chindia, is a Romanian professional football club based in Târgoviște, Dâmbovița County, which competes in the Liga I.

In 2010, as a result of quarrels between the owner of the original team of the city—last known as FCM Târgoviște—and the Târgoviște Municipality, the latter chose to found a new entity in association with former international Gheorghe Popescu and former referee Ion Crăciunescu. The club retains some elements from the now-dissolved FCM, such as the red and blue colour scheme and the "Chindia" name and crest used between 1996 and 2003. Micul Ajax participated for the first time in the Romanian top flight in the 2019–20 season, and the next year equalled FCM's best result in the competition by finishing seventh.

Chindia Târgoviște mainly inherited the local fanbase of the disbanded side, and continued the football history of the city by playing its home matches at the Eugen Popescu Stadium, which is currently under reconstruction.

History

FCM Târgoviște (1948–2010)

Târgoviște has never been a force of the Romanian football, nor a common participant in the first league, having meteoric, but notable appearances.

The first team of the town, FCM Târgoviște, was founded after the end of World War II in 1948 as Metalul Târgoviște. Subsequently named Energia (1956), then again Metalul (1957–1972), CS (1972–1994), Oțelul (1994–1996) and Chindia (1996–2003), the club spent only nine seasons of its existence in the top flight. It promoted for the first time in 1961, but was immediately relegated. Then "the Red and Blues" promoted again in 1977 and played constantly at the level of the first division for the next seven campaigns, with only a short break in the 1980–81 Divizia B. At the end of the 1970s and the beginning of the 1980s the football of Targoviște reached its peak, which besides launching a very good generation of players, achieved the best ranking in the history of the club, a seventh place at the end of the 1978–79 championship.

That squad of "the club situated under the Chindia Tower" would be called "the golden generation" and in its composition were the following players: Nicolae Dobrin, Silviu Dumitrescu, Ion Ene, Florea Alexandru, Ionel Pitaru, Dumitru Gheorghe, Claudius Sava, Nelu Isaia, Gheorghe Greaca, Nicolae Enache, Petre Marinescu, Ion Constantin, Ilie Niculescu, Viorel Radu, Constantin Miia, Gheorghe Voinea, Mihai Iatan, Mihai Banu, Mihai Mărgelatu, Gheorghe Filipescu and Dumitru Economu.

After relegating in 1984, CS Târgoviște did not recover, at one point even playing in the Divizia C. The year 1995 brought the promotion in the second division, followed by another one in 1996; Under the name CF Chindia and led from the bench by its former player Silviu Dumitrescu, the squad was one of the most notable that ever played on Eugen Popescu Stadium. Even if it probably was not as good as Dumitrescu's generation, the promotion achieved in 1996, after twelve years in the lower divisions, the playing style and the squad, which consisted in local players, earned Chindia the nickname Micul Ajax ("the Little Ajax"). In that squad of Chindia were players such as: Adrian Bogoi, Vasile Bârdeș, Bogdan Liță, Cristian Țermure, Cristian Bălașa, Remus Gâlmencea or Laurențiu Reghecampf. The period of glory was again a very short one and at the end of 1997–98 season Chindia returned to the second division.

In 2003 the team changed its name to FCM Târgoviște, and in the summer of 2004, due to financial issues it almost withdrew from the championship. On 19 August 2004, businessman Ghiorghi Zotic took over the club with the clear goal of saving it from both relegation and bankruptcy. In 2009, the team relegated back to Liga III and the relationship between Zotic and the Târgoviște Municipality started to strain, just like the one between him and the supporters. In March 2010, the Eugen Popescu Stadium rental agreement expired and was not extended. Since then the club moved away from Târgoviște to the Alpan Stadium in Șotânga. From this point on, FCM started its total decline and in 2015 Zotic dissolved the club's senior squad, only keeping the women's football team. After one year, FCM enrolled in the sixth tier, but after two seasons was dissolved again.

Rebirth as Chindia (2010–present)

On 11 August 2010, after the breakup between Zotic and the Târgoviște Municipality and supporters, the Municipality, together with Romanian former footballer Gheorghe Popescu, and in association with the former international referee Ion Crăciunescu, set up a new football club named FC Chindia. The club was at the beginning a football academy, similar to the model of the Gheorghe Hagi Football Academy within FC Viitorul Constanța.

After only one season, the club was promoted in the Liga II, but after a seventh place at the end of the 2011–12 edition it relegated back to Liga III. This relegation created tensions inside the club, with Gheorghe Popescu and Ion Crăciunescu leaving the project. Owned by Târgoviște Municipality and Dâmbovița County Council, Chindia returned in the second tier after two seasons, led from the bench by Nicolae Croitoru. After the second promotion to Liga II, Chindia became a more homogeneous team, consisting mostly of local players, as in the previous times of success (late 1970s, early 1980s and mid 1990s). "The Little Ajax" achieved third place then a fifth place, before missing the promotion after a two-legged promotion/relegation play-off against FC Voluntari, at the end of the 2017–18 season.

Finally, Chindia secured its promotion to Liga I at the end of the 2018–19 campaign by winning the second division. The promotion meant that the supporters were able to see a team from Târgoviște in the top-flight again after 21 years of absence, the last time being when defunct FCM Târgoviște played in the 1997–98 Divizia A. Chindia finished its inaugural Liga I season on the last place in the table, but was spared from relegation after winning the promotion/relegation play-off against CS Mioveni. The following year, the club equalled FCM's best result in the league championship by winning the relegation play-out and coming seventh overall.

Ground

The club plays its home matches on Eugen Popescu Stadium from Târgoviște, with a capacity of 6,500 seats. Opened in 1982 and originally with a capacity of 12,500 seats, Eugen Popescu Stadium is situated at 200 meters away from the Chindia Tower. In 2014, the second stand and half of the East end were closed for safety reasons, significantly reducing the arena's capacity. In the spring of 2019, due to team's performances and a potential promotion in the top flight, Târgoviște Municipality announced the renovation of the stadium for the amount of 16 million. During the renovation work, the team played its home matches on Ilie Oană Stadium and Municipal, from neighbouring Ploiești and Buzău, respectively.

Support
Chindia Târgoviște has an important group supporters in the city and also in Dâmbovița County, the majority of them being past supporters of FCM Târgoviște. The Chindia ultras faction is known as Cavalerii Cetății ("The Knights of the Fortress").

Rivalries
Chindia does not have many important rivalries, however, a local one between the old FCM and Flacăra Moreni was born before 1989, when the club from Moreni had the support of the communist regime. Tense matches and even incidents were also noted over time in the matches against Petrolul Ploiești and even if between the two clubs is not a proper rivalry, the supporters are not very friendly with each other.

An unusual rivalry also appeared between 2010 and 2015, when on the occasion of six matches, Chindia played against the original FCM Târgoviște, the first club of the city, moved to Șotânga at the time. This encounter was similar to derbies such as ASU Politehnica Timișoara vs ACS Poli Timișoara or CS Universitatea Craiova vs FC U Craiova 1948, entities which assert to be successors of the same teams.

Honours

Domestic

Leagues
Liga II
Winners (1): 2018–19
Liga III
Winners (2): 2010–11, 2014–15
Runners-up (1): 2013–14

Players

First team squad

Out on loan

Club officials

Board of directors

 Last updated: 6 September 2022
 Source:

Current technical staff

 Last updated: 6 September 2022
 Source:

League history

Notable former players
The footballers enlisted below have had international cap(s) for their respective countries at junior and/or senior level and/or more than 100 caps for AFC Chindia Târgoviște.

Romania

  Mihai Aioani
  Alexandru Băluță
  Cristian Cherchez
  Denis Ciobotariu
  Cristian Dancia
  Daniel Florea
  Georgian Honciu
  Paul Iacob
  Denis Ispas
  Marius Martac
  Liviu Mihai
  Sebastian Mladen
  Mihai Neicuțescu
  Dragoș Pătru
  Sorin Rădoi
  Marian Vătavu
  Bobi Verdeș
  Mihai Voduț
Burkina Faso
  Blaise Yaméogo
Moldova
  Vadim Rață
Sweden
  Valmir Berisha

Notable former managers

  Costel Pană 
  Silviu Dumitrescu
  Nicolae Croitoru
  Viorel Moldovan 
  Emil Săndoi

References

External links
 

Club profile on UEFA's official website
Club profile on LPF's official website

 
Football clubs in Dâmbovița County
Sport in Târgoviște
Association football clubs established in 2010
Liga I clubs
Liga II clubs
Liga III clubs
2010 establishments in Romania